Bapu Dham Superfast Express is an  Indian Railways train of the North Eastern Railway Zone Varanasi Division. It was introduced in 2008's Railway Budget and hence initiated its journey from July 2008. Bapu Dham Superfast Express consists of 14 coaches which includes one AC-III coach, three sleeper class coaches, 8 general (unreserved) coaches and 2 SLR overall 14 coaches.

Coach composition

Journey

References

Transport in Muzaffarpur
Passenger trains originating from Varanasi
Express trains in India
Rail transport in Bihar
Railway services introduced in 2008
Named passenger trains of India